Ciorlano is a comune (municipality) in the Province of Caserta in the Italian region Campania, located about  north of Naples and about  northwest of Caserta.

Ciorlano borders the following municipalities: Capriati a Volturno, Fontegreca, Prata Sannita, Pratella, Sesto Campano, Venafro.

References

Cities and towns in Campania